Kung Fu VS Acrobatic  (aka Thunderbolt 1991) is a 1990 Hong Kong martial arts fantasy comedy film directed by Taylor Wong and starring Andy Lau, Natalis Chan and Joey Wong. The film is a homage to the 1964 martial arts film Buddha's Palm which starred Cho Tat-wah, who also acts in a supporting role in this film.

Plot
Advertising company staff Mo Tak-fai (Lau) and his friend Lai Chi (Chan) go to mainland China for a business trip. Chi smuggles some relics, leading to them being chased by the police. They go into a cave to escape capture, but Chi is bitten by a poisonous snake. He finds a medicine belonging to an ancient hero named Long Jianfei and shares it with Tak-fai. Not only does the medicine detoxifies Chi, it also bestows Tak-fai and Chi internal strengths. They also rescue Princess Yunluo (Wong) and her maid Xiao Man (Mui) from the Yuan Dynasty after 800 years of slumber but in the process also releasing a two-hundred-year-old evil martial arts expert Tian Can (Yuen).

Fai and Chi remain skeptical about the things that happened  and they bring the two ladies to Hong Kong. Yunluo is able to adapt to modern life in Hong Kong very quickly. On the other hand, in order to defeat Tian Can, Yunluo helps Fai to learn the "Buddha's Palm" technique while Chi, due to poor qualifications, only excel at the "Seven Rotary Slice" technique. However, when Tian Can arrives he effortlessly defeats Fai since he has not mastered the "Ten Thousand Buddhas" technique. Tian Can forces Fai to eat a cursed silkworm, which can cause pain to people who consume it when Tian Can plays his drum.

The next day, Tian Can goes on a spree. He steals money from a bank ATM, threatens Fai and Chi to go to their boss' home and capture his family, as well as defeating the police who come after them. Yunluo saves the two men but Fai is furtherly injured by Tian Can in the process. Fortunately they come across Yim Chan, leader of a supernatural performing troupe from China, who heals Fai from his injuries while also channelling energy to him. A few days later, Fai finally masters the "Ten Thousand Buddhas" technique. He and his friends confront Tian Can in a final duel and Fai uses "Ten Thousand Buddhas" to cripple Tian Can's martial arts ability, becoming a true hero in the end.

Cast
Andy Lau as Mo Tak-fai
Natalis Chan as Lai Chi
Joey Wong as Princess Wan-lo
Yuen Wah as Tin-chan
Cutie Mui as Siu-man
Cho Tat-wah as Ku Se / Lung Kim-fei
Lau Shun as Yim Chan
Ngai Ping-lung as Mo Tak-fai's boss
Lau Chi-wing as Police captain
Shing Fui-On as Cop on motorcycle
Chan King as Human smuggler
San Kuai as Kao Li-chiu
Kong Chuen as Kao Li-pa
Lee Siu-kei as One of Pa's men
Jameson Lam as One of Pa's men
Lee Hang as One of Chiu's men
Lam Foo-wai as One of Chiu's men
Yiu Yau-hung as Taxi driver with spanner
Kwan Hoi-san as Man in intro (Footage from Buddha's Palm)
Ko Lo-chuen as Man in intro (Footage from Buddha's Palm)
Chan Wai-yu as Woman in intro (Footage from Buddha's Palm)
Yu So-chow as Woman in intro (Footage from Buddha's Palm)
Lam Fung as Woman in intro (Footage from Buddha's Palm)
Wong Chi-keung as Bus driver
Chin Tsi-ang as Old woman with child boarding bus
Hon San as National treasure seller

Theme song
Martial Arts Supreme (武林至尊) 
Composer: Lowell Lo
Lyricist: Peter Lai
Singer: Andy Lau
Young Hero (英雄出少年) (
Composer: Lowell Lo
Lyricist: James Wong
Singer: James Wong

Box office
The film grossed HK $21,160,216 at the Hong Kong box office during its theatrical run from 21 July to 11 August 1990 in Hong Kong.

See also
Andy Lau filmography
Yuen Wah filmography
Wong Jing filmography

External links

Kung Fu VS Acrobatic at Hong Kong Cinemagic

1990 films
1990 martial arts films
1990 action comedy films
1990s fantasy comedy films
Hong Kong action comedy films
Hong Kong fantasy comedy films
Wuxia films
Kung fu films
Hong Kong martial arts comedy films
Martial arts fantasy films
1990s Cantonese-language films
Films set in Hong Kong
Films shot in Hong Kong
Films directed by Taylor Wong
Films with live action and animation
1990s Hong Kong films